State Route 721 (SR 721) is a north–south state highway located in the western portion of the U.S. state of Ohio.

Route description
Along its way, SR 721's path takes it through southwestern Miami County, then along the border between Darke and Miami Counties. There is no section of SR 721 that is included within the National Highway System (NHS).  The NHS is a network of highways deemed to be most important for the country's economy, mobility and defense.

History
The SR 721 designation was assigned in 1937.  Throughout its history, the route has maintained the same alignment in the general vicinity of the boundary between the counties of Darke and Miami.  Originally, SR 721 was an unpaved roadway from its southern terminus at SR 49 to its junction with US 36.  The portion from that point through Bradford to its northern terminus at SR 185.  One year after its assignment, SR 721 was paved between SR 49 and Laura.  By 1940, the remaining gravel portion of the highway between Laura and US 36 was paved.

Major intersections

References

721
Transportation in Darke County, Ohio
Transportation in Miami County, Ohio